A sign-value notation represents numbers by a series of numeric signs that added together equal the number represented. In Roman numerals for example, X means ten and L means fifty. Hence LXXX means eighty (50 + 10 + 10 + 10). There is no need for zero in sign-value notation.

History 
Sign-value notation was the ancient way of writing numbers and only gradually evolved into place-value notation, also known as positional notation. When ancient people wanted to write "two sheep" in clay, they could inscribe in clay a picture of two sheep. But this would be impractical when they wanted to write "twenty sheep". In Mesopotamia they used small clay tokens to represent a number of a specific commodity, and strung the tokens like beads on a string, which were used for accounting.  There was a token for one sheep and a token for ten sheep, and a different token for ten goats, etc. To ensure that nobody could alter the number and type of tokens, they invented a clay envelope shaped like a hollow ball into which the tokens on a string were placed and then baked. If anybody contested the number, they could break open the clay envelope and do a recount. To avoid unnecessary damage to the record, they pressed archaic number signs on the outside of the envelope before it was baked, each sign similar in shape to the tokens they represented.  Since there was seldom any need to break open the envelope, the signs on the outside became the first written language for writing numbers in clay, using sign-value notation.

See also
 History of ancient numeral systems
 Place-value notation
 Location arithmetic: A base 2 sign-value notation invented by J. Napier in 1617

References

Sources 

  (Paperback).

External links
 Online Converter for Decimal/Roman Numerals (JavaScript, GPL)

Numeral systems